Traveler in Time may refer to:

 "Traveler in Time", a song by Fates Warning on their 1985 studio album The Spectre Within
 "Traveler in Time" (Blind Guardian song), a song by Blind Guardian on their 1990 studio album Tales from the Twilight World